David Carlson (born 13 March 1952) is an American composer.

Early life
Carlson studied theory and composition at the Los Angeles High School of the Arts and with Leonard Stein at the California Institute of the Arts. From 1988 to 1992 he was coordinator of the San Francisco Symphony's New and Unusual Music series.

Career

David Carlson's symphonic works have been performed by the Philadelphia Orchestra, the National Symphony Orchestra (United States), the San Francisco Symphony, the BBC Symphony, the Atlanta Symphony Orchestra, St. Louis Symphony Orchestra, Tanglewood Festival, and others.  He has composed several chamber pieces, including a Cello Sonata, a large work for cello and male chorus called Nocturno, and two cello concertos, as well as a large work for viola and piano called True Divided Light,  premiered in 2005.  Carlson is the recipient of an Academy Award in Music from the American Academy of Arts and Letters, two commissions from Meet the Composer, Chamber Music America, and several other grants and fellowships.  He has written four operas, three of which have had numerous performances.  The Midnight Angel, to a libretto and original story by author Peter S. Beagle, was commissioned by Opera Theatre of St. Louis, Glimmerglass Opera, and Sacramento Opera; in 2007 it received a new production by Milwaukee's Skylight Opera Theatre.  Dreamkeepers, with an original story and libretto by Aden Ross, was commissioned by the Utah Opera in celebration of the 1996 Utah Centennial and given a new production by the Tulsa Opera in 1998.  Anna Karenina, in collaboration with noted British librettist and director Colin Graham, was commissioned by Florida Grand Opera in celebration of the 2007 opening of the Ziff Opera House in Miami, with a co-production by Opera Theatre of Saint Louis.  Anna Karenina received a new production in September 2010 by Opera San Jose, and was performed again in April 2016 by Moores Opera Center at the University of Houston. David Carlson lived and worked in San Francisco his entire adult life and currently lives in Ajijic, Mexico, with his husband and partner of 37 years, Claudio Laghi.

Selected compositions 

 Carlson's works are published by Carl Fischer Music, Inc., New York.

Orchestra
 Toccata Robotica for orchestra (2010)
 Serenade for chamber orchestra (based on a keyboard work by J. C. Bach) (2006)
 Episodes from the opera Anna Karenina (2006)
 Bear Dance on Ute Indian Rhythms (2001)
 Quantumsymphony (2001)
 Symphonic Sequences from the opera Dreamkeepers (1996)
 Twilight Night (1989)
 Lilacs [Epitaph] (1991)
 Rhapsodies (1986)
 Quixotic Variations (1978)

Concertante
 Tuba Concerto (2014) for double string orchestra and harp
 Cello Concerto No. 1 (1979)
 Violin Concerto (1988)
 Cello Concerto No. 2 for solo cello and string orchestra or 15 solo strings (1997)

Chamber music
 Two Elegies for Flute, Oboe, Clarinet, Bassoon, Harp, and Piano (2017)
 Offering for Cello and Harp (2017)
 Incendiary Devices Three Tone Poems for Saxophone Quartet and Piano (2014)
 Woodwind Quartet (Flute, Oboe, Clarinet, Bassoon) (2010)
 String Quartet No. 2 (2008)
 True Divided Light, for viola and piano (2005) (also version for Violin and Piano)
 Absolute Music for saxophone quartet (2001)
 Glimmerglass Fanfare for brass quintet (2000)
 Quantum Quartet for clarinet, viola, cello and piano (1998)
 Resurrection for organ (1989)
 Sonata for cello and piano (1992)
 String Quartet No. 1 (1982)
 Hymnal Variations for piano 4 hands (1968)

Opera
  Anna Karenina  (2007); libretto by Colin Graham
 Dreamkeepers (1996); libretto by Aden Ross
 The Midnight Angel (1993); libretto by Peter S. Beagle

Chorus and orchestra
 Hymn, for SATB chorus and orchestra (poem by Edgar Allan Poe)
 Dona Nobis Pacem for chorus SATB, string orchestra, and celesta
 Constellations for chorus SATB, string orchestra, and harp (2000); text by Susan Kinsolving (also version for SATB chorus and orchestra)
 Nocturno (1991); Latin text from Psalms 113, 90, and 148
 Missa Lyrica (1969);  Latin text

Vocal music
 Two Poe Songs for soprano and piano; poems by Edgar Allan Poe ("Dream Within a Dream" and "Hymn"
 Himmelfarbenlied for soprano and piano; original lyrics by Susan Kinsolving (commissioned by Opera America)
 Dona Nobis Pacem, for chorus SATB, organ, and off-stage celesta (2010), Latin text from Psalm 133
 The Promise of Time, 3 Songs for soprano and large orchestra (2010); texts by Susan Kinsolving
 Vocalise for soprano and piano (2005)
 Constellations, Cantata for chamber chorus (2000); text by Susan Kinsolving
 Nocturno for solo cello and 8 male voices (1990); Latin text from Psalms 113 and 90
 The Martyrdom of Saint Sebastian, (1985) Concert Scene for tenor and orchestra
 "Nocturno", for SATB chorus, organ, and harp (2012), text from Psalms 113, 90, and 148

Recordings
New World Records CD: Symphonic Sequences from Dreamkeepers/Rhapsodies/Twilight Night/Cello Concerto No. 1; Stewart Robertson, conductor; Emil Miland, cello; The Utah Symphony.
Signum Records CD (London): Anna Karenina, Opera in Two Acts, Opera Theatre of Saint Louis, Stewart Robertson, conductor; The Saint Louis Symphony Orchestra
MSR Classics CD (U.S.): "True Divided Light"  for Viola and Piano/Sonata for Cello and Piano, Geraldine Walther, viola; Emil Miland, cello; David Korevaar, piano.   MS1283
The Opera America Songbook: "Himmelfarbenlied," Kelly Ann Bixby, soprano; Thomas Bagwell, piano.  Lyrics by Susan Kinsolving.  Available on Amazon.  Sheet music published by Schott, New York.

References

External links
 
 David Carlson's page at Carl Fischer
 
 
 
 
 

1952 births
20th-century classical composers
21st-century American composers
21st-century classical composers
Place of birth missing (living people)
American classical composers
American male classical composers
American opera composers
California Institute of the Arts alumni
Living people
Male opera composers
20th-century American composers
20th-century American male musicians
21st-century American male musicians